Chevalier-Montrachet is an Appellation d'origine contrôlée (AOC) and Grand Cru vineyard for white wine from Chardonnay in the Côte de Beaune subregion of Burgundy. It is located within the commune of Puligny-Montrachet. Bâtard-Montrachet borders on the Grand Cru vineyard Montrachet and on the Puligny-Montrachet Premier Cru vineyard Le Cailleret in the east. In terms of the Côte d'Or hillside, Chevalier-Montrachet is located above Montrachet, and is located highest of the five "Montrachet" vineyards. The AOC was created in 1937.

Etymology
The name derives from the Medieval legend that the Lord of Puligny divided his land between his eldest son ("le chevalier", the knight), his daughters ("les pucelles", the maidens) and his illegitimate son ("le bâtard", the bastard) : "Chevalier", "Bâtard" and "Les Pucelles" became three different plots within the commune of Puligny-Montrachet.

Production
In 2008,  of vineyard surface was in production within the AOC, and 311 hectoliter of wine was produced, corresponding to just over 41,000 bottles.

AOC regulations

The only grape variety allowed for Chevalier-Montrachet is Chardonnay, unlike other white Burgundy wines, where up to 15% Pinot Blanc may be added. The allowed base yield is 40 hectoliter per hectare, and the minimum grape maturity is 12.0 per cent potential alcohol.

See also
List of Burgundy Grand Crus

References

Burgundy (historical region) AOCs